Lars Helge Werner (25 July 1935 – 11 January 2013) was a Swedish socialist politician.

Werner was born in Stockholm. He was a member of the Riksdag from 1965 to 1994. A construction worker by profession, he was elected vice chairman of the Vänsterpartiet Kommunisterna (VPK) ("the Left Party - Communists") in 1967, and became party chairman in 1975. During his time as party leader, he worked to distance the party from the Soviet Union, a process that had been started by his predecessor as party leader, C.-H. Hermansson. In 1990, VPK changed its name to Vänsterpartiet ("the Left Party"), removing the term "Communists". Werner resigned as party leader in 1993, and was succeeded by Gudrun Schyman.

Werner died from a heart condition in 2013, at the age of 77.

References

1935 births
2013 deaths
Politicians from Stockholm
Swedish communists
Leaders of political parties in Sweden
Members of the Riksdag from the Left Party (Sweden)
Members of the Riksdag 1970–1973
Members of the Riksdag 1974–1976
Members of the Riksdag 1976–1979
Members of the Riksdag 1979–1982
Members of the Riksdag 1982–1985
Members of the Riksdag 1985–1988
Members of the Riksdag 1988–1991
Members of the Riksdag 1991–1994
20th-century Swedish politicians